Kolesov Log is a rural locality (a village) in Vakhnevskoye Rural Settlement, Nikolsky District, Vologda Oblast, Russia. The population was 21 as of 2002.

Geography 
Kolesov Log is located 60 km northwest of Nikolsk (the district's administrative centre) by road. Malinovka is the nearest rural locality.

References 

Rural localities in Nikolsky District, Vologda Oblast